Judo Australia (JA) is the National Sporting Organisation recognised by the Australian Sports Commission for the sport of Judo in Australia.

History
The body was founded in Sydney in 1952.

Structure
The national body has eight state member associations:
 Judo NSW
 Judo Victoria
 Judo Queensland
 Judo SA
 Judo WA
 Judo Tasmania
 Judo NT
 Judo ACT

The main tournament they organise is the annual Australian National Judo Championships.

See also

References

External links 

 

Australia
Judo in Australia
Sports governing bodies in Australia
1952 establishments in Australia
Sports organizations established in 1952
National members of the International Judo Federation
Judo organizations